The English College of St Gregory was a Roman Catholic seminary in Seville, Spain.  It was founded by the English Jesuit Robert Persons in 1592, when Roman Catholicism was illegal in England, to provide his native country with priests. 
The dedication of the college to St Gregory recalls the Gregorian mission of AD 596, which resulted in the Anglo-Saxons being converted to Christianity.

In 1596, in Seville, Persons wrote Memorial for the Reformation of England, concerning how England might be returned to the Roman Catholic faith. Teaching staff included Richard Smith who developed different ideas from Persons about the project. Partly through the influence of Cardinal Richelieu, Smith was to return to England as a Roman Catholic bishop.

The institution was short of funds, but it was supported by the Jesuits until 1767 when Charles III, in a surprise move, expelled the order from Spain.  Its assets were then transferred to the English College in Valladolid, which had also been founded by Persons.  This continued to function under the protection of the Spanish crown.

Alumni
 Archbishop Patrick Fitzsimons STD, Irish Bishop, served as Archbishop of Dublin
 Bishop Michael Fitzwalter, Irish Bishop who served as Auxiliary Bishop of Seville.

Other English Catholic Colleges
 English College, Douai, a past Catholic seminary in Douai, France, closed in 1793
 English College, Lisbon, a past Roman Catholic seminary in Lisbon, Portugal, closed in 1973
 English College, Valladolid, a residence and training centre for the training of Catholic priests in Valladolid, Spain
 English College, Rome, a Roman Catholic seminary in Rome, Italy

See also
 Catholic Church in Spain
 List of Jesuit sites

References

Defunct universities and colleges in Spain
Jesuit universities and colleges in Spain
Seminaries and theological colleges in Spain
1592 establishments in Spain
1767 disestablishments in Europe